Malta selected their Junior Eurovision entry for 2008 through Junior Eurosong, a national final consisting of 16 songs. The winner was Daniel Testa, with the song "Junior Swing".

Before Junior Eurovision

Junior Eurosong 08 
Junior Eurosong 2008 was the national final format developed by PBS to select the Maltese entry for the Junior Eurovision Song Contest 2008.

Competing entries 
Artists and composers were able to submit their entries between 7 and 8 August 2008. Artists were able to submit up to two songs, however, they could only compete with one song in the national final. PBS received 74 entries, and 36 songs were selected to compete in the semi-finals.

Semi-finals 
Two semi-finals took place on 9 and 11 September 2008, each featuring eighteen entries. Sixteen entries qualified for the final on 13 September 2008. Six juries (consisting of four adults and two kids) evaluated the songs during the shows and each jury had an equal stake in the final result. A seventh set of votes were the results of the public televote, which had a weighing equal to the votes of a single jury. The six members of the jury that evaluated the entries during both the semi-finals consisted of:
 Jesmond Baldacchino
 Simon Fenech
 Mark Andrews
 Annabelle Debono
 Michaela Attard (Kids Jury)
 Whitney Grech (Kids Jury)

Semi-final 1 
The first semi-final took place on 9 September 2008 where eighteen songs competed for eight spots in the final.

Semi-final 2 
The second semi-final took place on 11 September 2008 where eighteen songs competed for eight spots in the final.

Final 
The final took place on 13 September 2008. The votes of an eight-member jury panel (8/9) and the results of public televoting (1/9) determined the winner. Eight juries (consisting of four adults and four kids) evaluated the songs during the shows and each jury had an equal stake in the final result. A seventh set of votes were the results of the public televote, which had a weighing equal to the votes of a single jury. The eight members of the jury that evaluated the entries during the final consisted of:
 Sigmund Mifsud
 Moyra Felice
 Debbie Scerri
 J. Anvil
 Yorika Attard (Kids Jury)
 Jake Cortis (Kids Jury)
 Deborah Faye Mercieca (Kids Jury)
 Darren Deneo (Kids Jury)

At Eurovision  
On 14 October 2008 the running order for Junior Eurovision took place, and the Maltese song was given the spot to perform in the tenth position; the same as in the 2007 contest. Daniel Testa reached to end up in the fourth place, the best position for Malta in this contest. This was also the best European result for Malta since Chiara's second position placing in the Eurovision Song Contest 2005.

Voting

Notes

References 

Junior Eurovision Song Contest
Malta
2008